Bill Cosby Presents Badfoot Brown & the Bunions Bradford Funeral Marching Band (1972) is an album written and produced by Bill Cosby.

It is Cosby's fourth musical release, although he does not perform on the album, save for a vocal part on "Abuse". The music is in a jazz-funk style. Cosby released a similarly titled album in 1971, Badfoot Brown & the Bunions Bradford Funeral & Marching Band (note second "&") where he played electric piano.

Track listing

Tracks 2 and 5 feature vocals by Stu Gardner.

1972 albums
Bill Cosby albums
Jazz-funk albums
Instrumental albums
Sussex Records albums